Vincent Inigo (born 10 February 1983 in Agen) is a French rugby sevens player. He was selected to represent  at the 2016 Summer Olympics in Brazil.

His brother  is also a rugby player.

References

External links 
 
 
 
 

Sportspeople from Agen
1983 births
Living people
Male rugby sevens players
Rugby sevens players at the 2016 Summer Olympics
Olympic rugby sevens players of France
France international rugby sevens players
French rugby union players
Castres Olympique players
Biarritz Olympique players